The Barrage Vauban, or Vauban Dam, is a bridge, weir and defensive work erected in the 17th century on the River Ill in the city of Strasbourg in France. At that time, it was known as the Great Lock (grande écluse), although it does not function as a navigation lock in the modern sense of the word. Today it serves to display sculptures and has a viewing terrace on its roof, with views of the earlier Ponts Couverts bridges and Petite France quarter. It has been classified as a Monument historique since 1971.

The barrage was constructed from 1686 to 1690 in pink Vosges sandstone by the French Engineer Jacques Tarade according to plans by Vauban. The principal defensive function of the barrage was to enable, in the event of an attack, the raising the level of the River Ill and thus the flooding of all the lands south of the city, making them impassable to the enemy. This defensive measure was deployed in 1870, when Strasbourg was besieged by Prussian forces during the Franco-Prussian War, and resulted in the complete flooding of the northern part of the suburb of Neudorf.

Within the structure an enclosed corridor links the two banks and a lapidarium serves to display ancient plaster casts and copies of statues and gargoyles from Strasbourg Cathedral and Palais Rohan. Three of the arches are raised to permit navigation, and the corridor is carried across these by drawbridges. The roof was rebuilt in 1965-66 in order to construct the panoramic terrace. Admission to the barrage and terrace is free, and they are open daily from 09:00 to 19:30.

The Strasbourg Museum of Modern and Contemporary Art and the Commanderie Saint-Jean, now home to the prestigious École Nationale d'Administration, are both adjacent to the northern end of the barrage. The headquarters (Hôtel du Département) of the Bas-Rhin department is by the southern end.

Gallery

References

External links

Barrage Vauban  on archi-wiki.org 

Bridges in France
Buildings and structures completed in 1690
Fortifications in France
Monuments historiques of Strasbourg
Tourist attractions in Strasbourg
Weirs in France
1690 establishments in France